Eucalyptus decorticans, commonly known as the gum-top ironbark, is a species of tree that is endemic to Queensland. It has rough, dark grey or black "ironbark" on the trunk and larger branches, smooth white bark on the thinner branches, lance-shaped to curved adult leaves, flower buds in groups of seven, white flowers and conical, cup-shaped or barrel-shaped fruit.

Description
It has hard, dark grey to black ironbark on the trunk and larger branches, smooth white to greyish or yellow bark on the thinner branches. Flowering has been observed in April, August and September and the flowers are white.

Taxonomy and naming
Gum-top ironbark was first formally described in 1911 by Frederick Manson Bailey from a specimen collected near Eidsvold by Thomas Lane Bancroft. Bailey gave it the name Eucalyptus siderophloia f. decorticans and published the description in the Queensland Agricultural Journal. In 1921, Joseph Maiden raised the form to species level as Eucalyptus decorticans, publishing the change in his book A Critical Revision of the Genus Eucalyptus.<ref name="Maiden">{{cite book |last1=Maiden |first1=Joseph |title=A Critical Revision of the Genus Eucalyptus |date=1921 |publisher=Government Printer |location=Sydney |pages=231–232 |url=https://www.biodiversitylibrary.org/page/39920157#page/385/mode/1up |access-date=26 May 2019}}</ref> The specific epithet (decorticans) is derived from the Latin word decorticans meaning "without bark" referring to the peeling bark on the smaller branches.

Distribution and habitatEucalyptus decorticans grows in open forest on hills and hillsides in stony clay soils. It is widespread in southeastern Queensland.

Conservation status
This eucalypt is classified as "least concern" under the Queensland Government Nature Conservation Act 1992''.

See also
List of Eucalyptus species

References

Trees of Australia
decorticans
Myrtales of Australia
Flora of Queensland
Plants described in 1911
Taxa named by Joseph Maiden